Ray Boyanich (born 4 February 1947) is a former Australian rules footballer who played with Richmond in the Victorian Football League (VFL) during the 1970s.

Boyanich started out at Hawthorn, after being recruited from Western Australia, but when he could not break into the seniors he was picked up by Richmond. Although primarily a ruckman, he played out of the back pocket in their losing 1972 VFL Grand Final team. He played at SANFL club Woodville from 1973 to 1975 without success before returning for one final season with Richmond.

References

Holmesby, Russell and Main, Jim (2007). The Encyclopedia of AFL Footballers. 7th ed. Melbourne: Bas Publishing.

1947 births
Living people
Australian rules footballers from Western Australia
Richmond Football Club players
Woodville Football Club players